Emmanuel James Blackwell (born February 25, 1968) is a retired American basketball player.  Born in Mount Kisco, New York, he played collegiately for Dartmouth College.

Blackwell played for the Charlotte Hornets and Boston Celtics (1994–95) in the NBA for 13 games. He also played overseas in France, Spain (with Gijón Baloncesto), Italy, Israel and Turkey.  Blackwell played in the Continental Basketball Association (CBA) for the Capital Region Pontiacs, Hartford Hellcats, Oklahoma City Cavalry, La Crosse Catbirds, Pittsburgh Piranhas and La Crosse Bobcats.  He was named second team All-CBA in 1994 as a member of the Catbirds. Blackwell was a three-time selection to the CBA All-Defensive Team in 1994, 1995 and 1999.

References

External links

ACB.com Profile

1968 births
Living people
African-American basketball players
ALM Évreux Basket players
American expatriate basketball people in France
American expatriate basketball people in Israel
American expatriate basketball people in Italy
American expatriate basketball people in Spain
American expatriate basketball people in Turkey
American men's basketball players
Basketball players at the 1999 Pan American Games
Basketball players from New York (state)
Beşiktaş men's basketball players
Boston Celtics players
Capital Region Pontiacs players
Charlotte Hornets players
Cholet Basket players
Dartmouth Big Green men's basketball players
Dinamo Sassari players
Gijón Baloncesto players
Hapoel Jerusalem B.C. players
Hartford Hellcats players
Israeli Basketball Premier League players
La Crosse Catbirds players
Liga ACB players
Oklahoma City Cavalry players
Olympique Antibes basketball players
Oyak Renault basketball players
Pan American Games silver medalists for the United States
Pan American Games medalists in basketball
People from Mount Kisco, New York
Pittsburgh Piranhas players
Point guards
Sportspeople from Westchester County, New York
Undrafted National Basketball Association players
United States Basketball League players
Medalists at the 1999 Pan American Games
21st-century African-American people
20th-century African-American sportspeople